A special election was held in  April 26–28, 1803 to fill a vacancy caused by the resignation of Representative-elect John Cantine (DR)

Election results

Hasbrouck took office with the rest of the 8th Congress at the start of the 1st Session.

See also
List of special elections to the United States House of Representatives

References

New York 1803 07
New York 1803 07
1803 07
New York 07
United States House of Representatives 07
United States House of Representatives 1803 07